The 1991 CA-TennisTrophy was a men's tennis tournament played on indoor carpet courts at the Wiener Stadthalle in Vienna in Austria and was part of the World Series of the 1991 ATP Tour. It was the 17th edition of the tournament and was held from 14 October through 21 October 1991. First-seeded Michael Stich won the singles title.

Finals

Singles

 Michael Stich defeated  Jan Siemerink 6–4, 6–4, 6–4
 It was Stich's 4th singles title of the year and the 5th of his career.

Doubles

 Anders Järryd /  Gary Muller defeated  Jakob Hlasek /  Patrick McEnroe 6–4, 7–5
 It was Järryd's 5th title of the year and the 52nd of his career. It was Muller's 2nd title of the year and the 5th of his career.

References

External links
 ATP tournament profile
 ITF tournament edition details

 
CA-TennisTrophy
Vienna Open